Wuling may refer to:

People
 Xu Wuling (许武岭, born 14 September 1971), professional rower
 Yu Wuling (于武陵, born 810), poet
 Zhang Wuling (张武龄, 1889-1938), educator
 King Wuling of Zhao (趙武靈王, 340-295 BCE), ruler of the State of Zhao during the Warring States Period

Places

China
 Wuling District (武陵区), in Changde, Hunan
 Wuling Mountains (武陵山脉), mountain range in central China
 Mount Wuling (雾灵山), mountain in Beijing
 Wulingyuan (武陵源), scenic and historical site in Hunan, China
 Wuling, Chongqing (武陵镇), town in Wanzhou District
 Wuling, Guangxi (武陵镇), town in Binyang County
 Wuling, Henan (五陵镇), town in Tangyin County
 Wuling, Shanxi (武灵镇), town in Lingqiu County

Taiwan
 Wuling (mountain pass) (武嶺), mountain pass in Ren'ai, Nantou County
 Wuling Farm (武陵農場), tourist attraction in Heping, Taichung City
 Wuling National Forest Recreation Area (武陵國家森林遊樂區), in Heping, Taichung City

Other
 Wuling San Wan (五苓散丸), traditional Chinese medicine
 Wuling Motors (五菱汽车), Chinese automotive manufacturer 
 SAIC-GM-Wuling (上汽通用五菱汽车), Chinese joint-venture between Wuling Motors, General Motors and SAIC
 National Wu-Ling Senior High School (國立武陵高級中學), high school in Taoyuan, Taiwan

See also
 Wulin (disambiguation)